Nicholas Dan Thiessen (May 27, 1946 – November 1, 2014) was an American football player and coach.  He served as the head football coach at Tabor College in Hillsboro, Kansas from 1978 to 1980 and again from 1993 to 1998 and at McPherson College in McPherson, Kansas from 1986 to 1992.  Thiessen played professionally in the Canadian Football League (CFL).

Coaching career

McPherson
Thiessen was the head football coach for the McPherson College in McPherson, Kansas.  He held that position for seven seasons, from 1986 until 1992.  His coaching record at McPherson was 21 wins and 44 losses.

Tabor
Thiessen was the head football coach of the Tabor College in Hillsboro, Kansas for six seasons, from 1993 to 1998.  Theissen played quarterback for the college as well as competing on the tennis team before taking the coaching position.

High school
Thiessen also coached at the high school level, primarily in the Bakersfield, California area.

Head coaching record

College

References

1946 births
2014 deaths
American football quarterbacks
McPherson Bulldogs football coaches
Tabor Bluejays football coaches
Tabor Bluejays football players
High school football coaches in California
People from Wasco, California